The Baltic Open is a women's professional tennis tournament held at National Tennis Center Lielupe in Jūrmala, Latvia. It replaced the Moscow River Cup with the tournament joining the WTA Tour with it being classified as an International tournament. It takes place on outdoor clay courts.

The tournament's prize money is $250,000 and the main draw consists of 32 players in singles and 16 teams in doubles while the qualifying draw in singles consists of 16 players.

In 2021, the Baltic Open (its license) moved to Hamburg Germany to become the Hamburg European Open.

Results

Singles

Doubles

References
 Official website

 
Tennis tournaments in Latvia
Sports competitions in Latvia
Clay court tennis tournaments
WTA Tour
2019 establishments in Latvia
Baltic Open